Blue Ribbon Award can refer to:
 Blue Ribbon Award (railway), an annual award presented by the Japan Railfan Club
 Blue Ribbon Awards, annual Japanese film awards
 Blue Ribbon Award of Excellence in Education, awarded by the National Blue Ribbon Schools Program

See also
 Blue ribbon (disambiguation)